White Light from the Mouth of Infinity is a studio album by the American experimental rock band Swans. It was released in 1991, through the record label Young God. The band supported the album with a North American tour.

In 2015, it was remastered and made available digitally and in a 3CD (and 3LP) set along with Love of Life and an album of bonus tracks.

Critical reception 

The Los Angeles Times wrote that Michael Gira's "search for heaven and hell—in both mind and body—continues on its fascinating, sometimes harrowing way."

AllMusic described the album as "stunning" and a "clear starting point for the second half of Swans' unique career."

Track listing

Personnel 

 Michael Gira – vocals, backing vocals, acoustic guitar, keyboards, effects, samples, production
 Jarboe – vocals, backing vocals, keyboards, choral and orchestral arrangements
 Christoph Hahn – acoustic and electric guitar
 Clinton Steele – acoustic and electric guitar
 Norman Westberg – electric guitar
 Jenny Wade – bass guitar
 Anton Fier – drums, drum programming
 Nicky Skopelitis – acoustic and electric guitar, baglama, bazouki, banjo
 Vincent Signorelli – percussion
 Hahn Rowe – violin
 Steve Burgh – mandolin, 12-string guitar
 J. G. Thirlwell – engineering, re-mix assistance, programming and co-production on "Power and Sacrifice"
 Bryce Goggin – engineering
 Steve McAllister – engineering, programming (additional)
 Deryk Thomas – front cover illustration
 John Sarfell – inner sleeve foldout painting
 Patricia Mooney – sleeve layout
 Brian Martin – re-mixing
 Alex Armitage – re-mix assistance

Charts

References

External links 
 

Swans (band) albums
1991 albums
Young God Records albums
Albums produced by Michael Gira